"Keep It Natural" is the first single taken from Australian singer Cosima De Vito's second studio album This Is Now. It reached the top thirty in the ARIA Club Charts and reached #4 on the AIR Independent Charts, and even charted on the ARIA Singles Chart, at #112.

References

2007 singles
Cosima De Vito songs
2007 songs
Songs written by Trevor Steel